Eastern Air Command was the part of the Royal Canadian Air Force's Home War Establishment responsible for air operations on the Atlantic coast of Canada during the Second World War. It played a critical role in anti-submarine operations in Canadian and Newfoundland waters during the Battle of the Atlantic.  Eastern Air Command also had several fighter squadrons and operational training units under its umbrella.

Order of battle

10 September 1939

HQ Halifax, Nova Scotia.

1 January 1943
HQ Halifax, Nova Scotia

 No. 1 Group.  HQ St. John's, Newfoundland

6 June 1944
 HQ Halifax, Nova Scotia

No. 1 Group, HQ St. John's, Newfoundland

No. 5 (Gulf) Group, HQ Gaspé, Quebec

No. 12 (Operational Training) Group
No. 12 Group was headquartered at Halifax, Nova Scotia and No. 3 Training Command RCAF had its headquarters at Montreal, Quebec.

No. 3 Training Command provided training for the British Commonwealth Air Training Plan (BCATP), flying from air bases throughout Quebec and the Maritime provinces.  The schools were operated by the RAF or the RCAF however the operational training units were RCAF units and under command of No. 12 Group, RCAF Eastern Air Command.  The assigned training schools and units conducted advanced flying courses including Service Flying Training (SFTS), Air Observer (AOS), Bombing and Gunnery (BGS), General Reconnaissance (ocean patrol) (GRS), Naval Aerial Gunnery (NAGS), Air Navigation (ANS) and Operational (OTU) training throughout the war (see the following table).

Together with some of the advanced aircraft types these units mainly flew hundreds of older bomber and patrol aircraft that had been relegated to armed training roles.  Training Command aircraft were very active everywhere over the entire Eastern Command Area of Operations and therefore made an important contribution to the surveillance of the region acting as a force multiplier -providing extra eyes and ears on watch for enemy U-Boats during flying patrols -particularly during the emergency of the Battle of the St. Lawrence when some of the units temporarily took part as a stop gap measure.

A good example of the training schools involvement in operations with the EAC during the emergency of the battle is illustrated by author Hugh A. Haliday wrote: "The need for Atlantic patrols was undiminished, yet the Battle of the St. Lawrence stretched EAC resources. Based at Charlottetown, 31 General Reconnaissance School was mobilized to fly patrols using Avro Ansons, each carrying two 250-pound bombs. At the very outset of the war the Anson and its ordnance had failed in RAF anti-submarine work. Now in Canada it was remobilized as an aerial scarecrow. German views varied as to Canadian countermeasures. The captain of U-517 found his operations increasingly restricted by strengthened air patrols. In October 1942, U-69 reported “strong sea patrol and constant patrol by aircraft with radar.”

See also
RCAF Western Air Command
David Ernest Hornell
Convoy ONS 5
Battle of the St. Lawrence
Leonard Birchall
Canadian Northwest Atlantic

References

Units and formations of the Royal Canadian Air Force
Canadian armed forces air commands
Military units and formations established in 1938
Battle of the Atlantic
Military units and formations of Canada in World War II